The Florida Jades were a professional basketball franchise based in Boca Raton, Florida from 1991 to 1992. The team played its inaugural season in the World Basketball League, which folded before the schedule ended. Notable players include Guard Tracy Moore.

The Jades played its home games at the Florida Atlantic University Arena.

References

Sources
 http://www.apbr.org/wbl88-92.html

World Basketball League teams
Sports in Boca Raton, Florida
1991 establishments in Florida
1992 disestablishments in Florida
Basketball teams established in 1991
Sports clubs disestablished in 1992